The Alderton Tunnel sits on the South Wales Main Line in England, on a stretch of line between Swindon and Bristol Parkway.

Building of the tunnel commenced at least two years before 1903, as the rise in railway workers boarding in Alderton village can be seen in the 1901 Census.

As part of the modernisation of the Great Western main line, the route through the tunnel closed from 19 August to 15 September 2017 to allow overhead electrification equipment to be fitted.

References

South Wales Main Line
Railway tunnels in England
Rail transport in Wiltshire
Great Western Railway
Tunnels completed in 1903
Tunnels in Wiltshire